Weiding is a municipality in the district of Schwandorf in Bavaria, Germany.

History
In the 10th and 11th centuries, Bavarian settlers wandered from Nabburg to the east.
Weiding was founded before 1270 and is one of the oldest villages of the region.
It frequently changed ownership and in 1803, it was finally sold to the Earl of Du Moulin-Eckart to whom it still belongs today.

Geography
Weiding is located on a plateau with the mountain Frauenstein to the southwest and the Hüttenbach-valley to the east, with the hamlets Reimermühle, Sägmühle, Andreasthal and Löwenthal.

Villages and hamlets
 Andreasthal
 Frauenthal
 Löwenthal
 Preißhof
 Reimermühle
 Sägmühle
 Weiding
 Wirtsmühle

Religion
In 1280 a stone church of St. Nikolaus is mentioned in an urbarium.
It was destroyed by the Hussites in the 15th century.
The rebuilt church burned down in 1836.
The current church was built in 1842 and like the others dedicated to St. Nikolaus.
To the parish of Weiding belong also the church St. Laurentius of Schönau and the church St. Michael of Hannesried.
95% of the inhabitants of Weiding are Catholics.

Priests in Weiding since 1900:
 1900 to 1905 Josef Prasch
 1905 to 1920 Josef Köppelle
 1920 to 1930 Georg Kiener
 1930 to 1935 Sturm
 1935 to 1954 Paulinus Fröhlich
 1954 to 1959 Josef Bock
 1959 to 1974 Franz Xaver Hebauer
 1974 to 1991 Michael Reitinger
 1991 to 2017 Jan Adrian Łata

Bibliography
 Teresa Guggenmoos: Stadt Schönsee. Verlag der Stadt Schönsee, Schönsee 1981
 Heribert Batzl (Hrsg.): Der Landkreis Oberviechtach in Vergangenheit und Gegenwart. Verlag für Behörden und Wirtschaft R. Alfred Hoeppner, Aßling/Obb. und München 1970
 Franz Liebl, Heimatkreis Bischofteinitz (Hrsg.): Unser Heimatkreis Bischofteinitz. Brönner & Daentler KG, Eichstätt 1967
 Paulinus Fröhlich: Weiding bei Schönsee Beiträge zur Geschichte des Ortes. Weiding 1956
 Emma Baier: Kirchen, Kapellen, Marterl und Feldkreuze in und um Weiding, Landkreis Schwandorf. Direktion für ländliche Entwicklung, Regensburg 2003
 Richard Bierl, Gemeinde Tiefenbach/Bayern (Hrsg.): Chronik der Gemeinde Tiefenbach/Bayern. Carl Mayr, Buch- und Offsetdruckerei, Amberg 1980

References

External links

 Weiding Parish

Schwandorf (district)